Heinz Greiner (12 August 1895 – 19 November 1977) was a German general in the Wehrmacht during World War II. He was a recipient of the Knight's Cross of the Iron Cross with Oak Leaves of Nazi Germany.

Career 
During Operation Barbarossa Greiner reached divisional level command. The division was destroyed in the Soviet Operation Bagration in the summer of 1944, along with much of Army Group Centre. Greiner was transferred to Italy where he took command of the 362nd Infantry Division. Losses were so heavy in the division in Italy that a bit of doggerel made the rounds:
The division of Greiner
Gets chopped ever finer
Until roll call's a one liner
That simply says: Greiner.

Awards and decorations
 Iron Cross (1914) 2nd Class (4 December 1914) & 1st Class (25 November 1918)
 Clasp to the Iron Cross (1939)  2nd Class (4 October 1939) & 1st Class (20 October 1939)
 Knight's Cross of the Iron Cross with Oak Leaves
 Knight's Cross on 22 September 1941 as Colonel (Oberst ) and commander of Grenadier Regiment 499.
 572nd Oak Leaves on 5 September 1944 as Major-General (Generalleutnant) and commander of the 362nd Infantry Division

References

Citations

Bibliography

1895 births
1977 deaths
20th-century Freikorps personnel
German Army personnel of World War I
German prisoners of war in World War II held by the United States
Lieutenant generals of the German Army (Wehrmacht)
Military personnel from Bavaria
People from Amberg
People from the Kingdom of Bavaria
Recipients of the clasp to the Iron Cross, 1st class
Recipients of the Knight's Cross of the Iron Cross with Oak Leaves
German Army generals of World War II